Thomas Williams (born April 20, 1991) is a Canadian former ice dancer. He competed at three Four Continents Championships with his skating partners, Nicole Orford and Sarah Arnold.

Personal life 
Thomas Williams was born on April 20, 1991, in Calgary, Alberta. He is the nephew of Canadian speed skater Michelle Morton. He has a car detailing business and has also worked for a financial services company.

Skating career

Early years 
Williams began learning to skate in 1995. He skated with Alicia Williams in the 2007–2008 season. During the following two seasons, he competed with Olga Lioudvinevitch, placing ninth on the junior level at the 2010 Canadian Championships.

Partnership with Orford 
Williams began training with Nicole Orford in May 2010. Competing on the 2010–11 ISU Junior Grand Prix series, they took the bronze medal in England and placed fifth in the Czech Republic. After becoming junior national champions, they were sent to the 2011 World Junior Championships and finished eighth.

During the 2011–12 ISU Junior Grand Prix, Orford/Williams won gold in Brisbane, Australia, and finished sixth in Austria. Due to Skate Canada rules, they competed on the senior level at the 2012 Canadian Championships and came in sixth. They also placed sixth at the 2012 World Junior Championships.

Orford/Williams made their senior international debut in the 2012–13 season. Competing on the Grand Prix series for the first time, they placed eighth at the 2012 Rostelecom Cup and fourth at the 2012 NHK Trophy. After winning the bronze medal at the 2013 Canadian Championships, they were assigned to the 2013 Four Continents Championships and finished sixth.

In the summer of 2013, Williams injured both ankles due to boot problems, causing the team to reduce their training to 20 minutes at a time. They won bronze at the U.S. Classic and placed eighth at the 2013 Trophée Éric Bompard. Fifth at the 2014 Canadian Championships, Orford/Williams were not named in Canada's Olympic team but were sent to the 2014 Four Continents Championships, where they placed fifth. Their final competition together was the 2015 Canadian Championships.

Partnership with Arnold 
Following a tryout with Sarah Arnold in February 2015, Williams took a year off due to an Achilles injury and financial reasons. They continued to skate together occasionally (around eight times) and began a formal partnership in March 2016. They placed 5th at the 2018 Canadian Championships and 8th at the 2018 Four Continents Championships. They are coached by Megan Wing and Aaron Lowe in Burnaby, British Columbia.

Programs

With Arnold

With Orford

Competitive highlights 
GP: Grand Prix; CS: Challenger Series; JGP: Junior Grand Prix

With Arnold

With Orford

Early partnerships

References

External links 

 
 Nicole Orford / Thomas Williams at Skate Canada

Canadian male ice dancers
1991 births
Living people
Figure skaters from Calgary
21st-century Canadian people